The following lists events of the year 2023 in Venezuela.

Incumbents 

 President: Nicolás Maduro
 Vice President: Delcy Rodríguez

Governors 

 Amazonas: Miguel Rodríguez
 Anzoátegui: Antonio Barreto Sira
 Apure: Ramón Carrizales
 Aragua: Rodolfo Clemente Marco Torres and Daniela González
 Barinas: Argenis Chávez
 Bolívar: Justo Noguera Pietri
 Carabobo: Rafael Lacava
 Cojedes: Margaud Godoy
 Delta Amacuro: Lizeta Hernández
 Falcón: Víctor Clark
 Guárico: José Manuel Vásquez
 Lara: Adolfo Pereira Antique
 Mérida: Ramón Guevara
 Miranda: Héctor Rodríguez
 Monagas: Yelitza Santaella and Cosme Arzolay
 Nueva Esparta: Alfredo Díaz
 Portuguesa: Rafael Calles
 Sucre: Edwin Rojas
 Táchira: Laidy Gómez
 Trujillo: Henry Rangel Silva
 Vargas: José Manuel Suárez
 Yaracuy: Julio León Heredia
 Zulia: Manuel Rosales

Events 
Ongoing — COVID-19 pandemic in Venezuela

January 
 1 January - Colombia and Venezuela agrees to reopen the last remaining border that has been previously blocked by authorities due to worsening ties.
 5 January – Juan Guaidó's interim government dissolves.

Deaths 

 6 January – Victoria de Stefano, 82, Italian-Venezuelan writer

See also 
 Hyperinflation in Venezuela
 2023 in politics and government
 2020s
 2020s in political history

References 

 
Venezuela
Venezuela
2020s in Venezuela
Years of the 21st century in Venezuela